Rebellion is a German heavy metal band. It was formed in 2001 when guitarist Uwe Lulis left Grave Digger in 2000, taking ex-Grave Digger bassist Tomi Göttlich with him.

Band history 

The band's first album was a concept album about William Shakespeare's work Macbeth, and included spoken passages with members of the band and other people as the story's characters.

The second album involved more standard heavy metal lyrics—about motorcycles, metal, war, etc.—and the music was somewhat rougher.

In 2005, the band released the first part of what is intended to be a trilogy about the Vikings and Norse mythology. In the beginning of 2007, they released their second part in the trilogy about the Vikings. It was titled Miklagard and was the band's most successful album so far. In 2009, they released the album Arise: From Ginnungagap to Ragnarök, the third and last part of the trilogy.  

Ex-drummer Randy Black is now playing in Primal Fear; ex-guitarist Björn Eilen is playing in Silver Maiden and The Talkies.

In late 2010, three members of the band, Uwe Lulis, Gerd Lücking, and Simone Wenzel, departed, leaving the remaining two members with the band.

Personnel 

 Michael Seifert — vocals (2001-present)
 Stephan Karut — guitars (2011-present)
 Tomi Göttlich — bass (2001-present)
 Tommy Telkemeier — drums (2016–present)

Former personnel
 Oliver Geibig — guitars (2011-2019)
 Björn Eilen — guitars (2001–2005)
 Randy Black — drums (2001–2003)
 Uwe Lulis — guitars (2001–2010)
 Simone Wenzel — guitars (2005–2010)
 Gerd Lücking — drums (2004–2010)
 Matthias Karle — drums (2011–2013)
 Timo Schneider — drums (2013–2016)

Timeline

Discography

Albums
 Shakespeare's Macbeth – A Tragedy in Steel (2002)
 Born a Rebel (2003)
 Sagas of Iceland – The History of the Vikings Volume 1 (2005)
 Miklagard – The History of the Vikings Volume 2 (2007)
 Arise: From Ginnungagap to Ragnarök – The History of the Vikings Volume III (2009)
 Arminius – Furor Teutonicus (2012) 
 Wyrd bið ful aræd – The History of the Saxons (2015)
 A Tragedy in Steel Part II: Shakespeare's King Lear (2018)
 We Are The People (2021)

Other releases

 "Miklagard" (single) (2006)
 The Clans Are Marching (EP) (2009)

Music videos
 "Miklagard" (2006)

References

External links 
 Official homepage
 Official merchandise shop

German power metal musical groups
German heavy metal musical groups
Musical groups established in 2001